Danny Greenspoon is a Canadian music producer, music engineer, guitar player and film composer mainly in the Canadian music industry. Greenspoon is also the President of "The Audio Truck Inc.", a mobile recording studio recording materials for television, radio, and record. From 1989 to 1996, he was Popular Music recording producer for CBC Radio in Toronto producing recordings of jazz, popular music, folk music, country music and world music, for broadcast and commercial release, and from 2004 to 2016 he did most of the live recording for JazzFM91.

Early life
Originally from Montreal, during the early part of his career, Greenspoon was a performer primarily on the acoustic music scene, travelling across Canada and the United States.

Career
In 1978 he moved to Toronto to join Sylvia Tyson and The Great Speckled Bird, and later became a guitarist for many other prominent Canadian acts, such as Murray McLauchlan, Kate & Anna McGarrigle, and was also a member of the quirky mid 80's act, The Romaniacs. Greenspoon played, as part of The Great Speckled Bird, for both seasons of Sylvia Tyson's CBC TV show Country In My Soul (1982-1983) and also played guitar for the entire 5 season run of the CBC Radio show Swinging On A Star (1989-1994) hosted by Murray McLauchlan which featured top acts from Canada and the US in an acoustic, live-to-tape, informal setting.

Greenspoon has produced over 50 albums mainly in Canada for Great Big Sea, Spirit of the West, Jane Bunnett, Ian Tyson, Willie P. Bennett, Joel Kroeker, Susan Crowe, The Paperboys, The Barra MacNeils, The Good Brothers, The Pukka Orchestra and Victoria Williams, among many others.
 
Most notable productions with certified platinum sales were:
Quadruple Platinum sales for Great Big Sea album Play
Triple Platinum sales for Great Big Sea album Up
Platinum sales for Spirit of the West album Save This House

Nominations / Awards
Received Gemini Award for Best Original Music Score for the documentary My Grandparents Had A Hotel (1991).
Received Gemini Award for Best Sound In a Comedy, Variety or Performing Arts Program The Gospel Challenge (2007)
Albums produced by Danny Greenspoon have been nominated 16 times for Juno nominations winning 5 Juno Awards.
Albums produced by him have also won six East Coast Music Awards including:
Album of the Year for Great Big Sea (1998)
Single of the Year for Great Big Sea (1998)
Album of The Year for Bruce Guthro (2002)
Nominated as Producer of the Year in Maple Blues Awards (2002)
Nominated as Jazz Producer of the Year at the National Jazz Awards (twice, 2004 and 2005)

References

External links
Official site

Year of birth missing (living people)
Living people
Place of birth missing (living people)
Canadian record producers